Grace Hospital is an American historic hospital in Richmond, Virginia.  The original Colonial Revival structure was built in 1911 based on a design by noted Virginia architect Charles M. Robinson.  The hospital is located to the west of Richmond's central business district and was substantially expanded by additions in 1930 and 1964.  The original three-story main structure with an entrance pavilion on West Grace Street, is a Colonial Revival building with paired Ionic order columns and gauged arches.  In 1930, a five-story Moderne style addition was built to the south along Monroe Street.  In 1964, a further three-story addition was built along Grace Street.  The 1964 addition is devoid of ornamentation, and the west wing "projects a modern, utilitarian character."

The hospital building was listed on the National Register of Historic Places in 2004. It was the birthplace in 1951 of Donnie Corker.

The building was renovated and turned into an apartment building from 2015 to 2017.

References

Hospital buildings completed in 1911
Hospital buildings completed in 1930
Hospital buildings completed in 1964
National Register of Historic Places in Richmond, Virginia
Colonial Revival architecture in Virginia
Moderne architecture in Virginia
Hospital buildings on the National Register of Historic Places in Virginia
1911 establishments in Virginia